The 2021–22 Nemzeti Bajnokság I/A season, also known as Tippmix Férfi NB I/A for sponsorship reasons, is the 91st season of the Nemzeti Bajnokság I/A, the highest professional basketball league in Hungary. Falco Vulcano is the defending champion. It started on 21 September 2021 with the first round of the regular season and will end in 26 June 2022 with the last game of the finals.

Teams

Team changes

Arenas and locations

Personnel and kits
All teams are obligated to have the logo of the Hungarian national sports betting brand Tippmix sponsor. Their logo is therefore present on all team kits.

Managerial changes

Regular season

League table

Schedule and results
In the table below the home teams are listed on the left and the away teams along the top.

Second round

1st–5th Placement matches

Results

6th–10th Placement matches

Results

11th–14th Placement matches

Results

Relegation play-out

|}

Playoffs
All three rounds (except Third place series) of the playoffs were played in a best-of-five format, with the higher seeded team playing the first, third and fifth (if it was necessary) game at home.

Quarterfinals

|}

Semifinals

|}

Finals

|}

Game 1

Game 2

Game 3

Game 4

Game 5

Third place series
The Third place series were played best-of-three format, with the higher seeded team playing the first and third (if it was necessary) game at home.

|}

Final standings

Statistics

Number of teams by counties and regions

Hungarian clubs in European competitions

See also

 2022 Magyar Kupa

References

External links
 Hungarian Basketball Federaration 

Nemzeti Bajnoksag I/A (men's basketball) seasons
Hungarian
Nemzeti Bajnoksag Men